The Rites of Eleusis were a series of seven public invocations or rites written by British occultist Aleister Crowley, each centered on one of the seven classical planets of antiquity. They were dramatically performed by Aleister Crowley, Leila Waddell (Laylah), and Victor Benjamin Neuburg in October and November, 1910, at Caxton Hall, London. This act brought Crowley's occult organization the A∴A∴ into the public eye.

The Rites
The names of the seven Rites are The Rite of "Saturn", "Jupiter", "Mars", "Sol", "Venus", "Mercury" and "Luna". Crowley claimed that the Rites were designed to inspire the audience with 'religious ecstasy', and that merely reading them would help people "cultivate their highest faculties". Some in the popular press thought otherwise, and considered the Rites an immoral display, riddled with 'blasphemy and erotic suggestion.' The Rite of Luna was danced by Joan Hayes also known as Ione de Forest, a lover of Victor Neuberg

In print
Rites of Eleusis: As Performed at Caxton Hall 
Illustrated by Dwina Murphy-Gibb. Edited by Keith Richmond. UK: Mandrake, 1990 (limited edition of 1,000 copies). Contains the complete scripts of all the Rites, with introduction by Richmond and explanatory essays by Richmond and Terence DuQuesne. Also includes a series of adorations, The Treasure House of Images by Capt J.F.C. Fuller, and Crowley's Magick Book 4 (Liber O).

Contemporary Performances

Several modern Ordo Templi Orientis groups regularly perform the Rites of Eleusis as written by Crowley.  There is an additional "Rite of Earth" not written by Crowley which was penned by Lon Milo Duquette and others as a logical extension of the Rites to complete the sequence from Saturn (Binah) to Earth (Malkuth).

Beginning in 2000, Seattle based Eleusyve Productions has been composing original musical arrangements for each of the plays comprising The Rites of Eleusis. All seven have been created and staged, with the final video, "Rite of Saturn", released in May 2020.

On March 7, 2008 experimental media artist Raymond Salvatore Harmon presented a three channel video performance of the Rites of Eleusis at Horse Hospital Gallery London, UK, by recontextualizing them into seven abstract films containing all of the original content as subliminal content hidden within each film.

References

Sources 
Crowley, Aleister - Rites of Eleusis: As Performed at Caxton Hall''' 
King, Francis - The Rise of Western Occultism

External links
 The full text of the Rites of Eleusis

Thelemite texts
1910 non-fiction books
Works by Aleister Crowley